The Copeland Tops State Conservation Area is a protected conservation area located near the Barrington Tops in the Hunter Region of New South Wales, Australia.

Features
Relics of the "Mountain Maid" gold mine may be visited with a tour guide. Gold was discovered by timber collectors in 1875. By 1878, around one thousand people were living in the area. Most of the gold mining activity had ceased by 1890. At the end of 1886, the Mountain Maid mine yielded  of gold. And the Hidden Treasure mine yielded .

Flora include wet sclerophyll eucalyptus forest and a unique "dry" rainforest. Rainforest trees present include shatterwood, black booyong, Moreton Bay fig, and the white cedar. Of note is the large epiphytic ferns growing in the rainforest, such as birds nest ferns, staghorn fern, and elkhorn ferns.

Koalas, eastern grey kangaroos, red-necked wallabies, wombats, and greater gliders are some of the many marsupial animals found here. Microbats rest in the gold mine shafts during the day.

See also

 Protected areas of New South Wales

References 

Mid-Coast Council
Forests of New South Wales
State conservation areas in New South Wales